Jossimar Israel Sanchez (born September 4, 1991) is a Dominican American soccer player.

Career
Sanchez played four years of college soccer at the University of Connecticut between 2009 and 2012. While at college, Sanchez also appeared for USL PDL side Central Jersey Spartans in 2011.

On January 22, 2013 Sanchez was selected 4th in the 2013 MLS Supplemental Draft by New England Revolution, and was signed over a year later on February 24, 2014. He was later loaned out to New England's USL Pro affiliate Rochester Rhinos. On December 8, 2014 the New England Revolution declined his contract option.

References

External links

1991 births
Living people
American sportspeople of Dominican Republic descent
Sportspeople from Paterson, New Jersey
Dominican Republic footballers
American soccer players
Soccer players from New Jersey
Association football defenders
UConn Huskies men's soccer players
Central Jersey Spartans players
New England Revolution players
Rochester New York FC players
New England Revolution draft picks
USL League Two players
USL Championship players
Dominican Republic expatriate sportspeople in Finland
Närpes Kraft Fotbollsförening players
American expatriate soccer players